Bloomreach Experience Manager - Developer Edition, formerly known as Hippo CMS is an open-source, dual licensed, Content Management System.

Architecture 

There are three components to Bloomreach Experience Manager:

Delivery Tier
The Hippo Site Toolkit (HST) is the presentation framework, using either JSP or FreeMarker to generate pages. Alternatively, a REST API can be defined to serve structured content.

Interface
The user interface through which the content management and administrative functionalities can be used.

Content Repository
All content, metadata and configuration is stored in a modified version of Apache Jackrabbit.

License 
Bloomreach Experience Manager - Developer Edition is available under the ASL 2.0. Some modules are only available under a commercial license.

Acquisition 
In October 2016, Hippo CMS was acquired by BloomReach, an e-commerce personalization company.

References

External links 
 Bloomreach Developer Site
 Bloomreach Corporate Site

Free content management systems